Stoicănești is a commune in Olt County, Muntenia, Romania. It is composed of a single village, Stoicănești.

References

Communes in Olt County
Localities in Muntenia